The 4 × 400 metres relay races at the 1984 Summer Olympics was contested as part of the athletics program.

Summary
The final saw Sunday Uti start off with a strong leg in lane 7, giving the Nigerian team the lead going in to the first handoff. Moses Ugbusien took the baton rather casually, the slow start giving Darren Clark the chance to pass during the curve, putting Australia into the lead at the break.  Taking an efficient tangent from lane 8, Ray Armstead gained ground on Ugbusien, moving to his shoulder to try to make a pass for the Americans on the stretch, 4 meters behind Clark who was running a 43.86 split, which exactly equalled Lee Evans' world record at the time. Ugbusien didn't relent and the two teams passed virtually even. On the handoff, Alonzo Babers got the edge, trying to keep up with Rotimi Peters. The long striding Babers took off in pursuit of Gary Minihan, with the three teams well ahead of the next pursuing team from Great Britain. Coming off the final turn, Babers smoothly went past Minihan and pulled away to a 7 meter lead by the handoff to Antonio McKay. Behind the action at the front, Todd Bennett steadily chipped away what was more than a 10 meter deficit to put Britain but a step behind Nigeria at the final handoff. McKay kept the American lead for the victory. There a was a battle for the other medals, with Rick Mitchell holding the Australian advantage of about two meters over Innocent Egbunike for Nigeria, with Phil Brown another step back for Britain. With Egbunike training at an American university Azusa Pacific, he was quite familiar to the spectators. Down the backstretch, Egbunike gained on Mitchell, moving on to his outside shoulder to pounce coming off the final turn. Behind Egbunike, Brown was staying in close contact still on the inside. Then, as Egbunike attacked, Brown went to the outside making it three abreast with 70 meters to go. Mitchell couldn't keep up, but Egbunike and Brown ran stride for stride for 50 meters. In the final 20 meters, Brown gained a slight advantage and crossed the line ahead for the silver medal. Nigeria's consolation was the African continental record.

Medalists

Note: * mark athletes who ran in the heats only

Abbreviations

Records
These were the standing world and Olympic records (in minutes) prior to the 1984 Summer Olympics.

Results

Final

Semi-final
Heat 1

Heat 2

Heats
Heat 1

Heat 2

Heat 3

Heat 4

See also
Athletics at the Friendship Games – Men's 4 × 400 metres relay

References

External links
Results

4 x 400 metres relay men
Relay foot races at the Olympics
Men's events at the 1984 Summer Olympics